Klamroth is a surname. Notable people with this name include:
Hans Georg Klamroth (1898–1944), Nazi businessman and reserve officer who participated in an attempt to assassinate Hitler
Kathrin Klamroth (born 1968), German mathematician and computer scientist
Lola Klamroth, actress in 2018 Italian-French film Capri-Revolution
Sabine Klamroth (born 1933), German lawyer and author
Wibke Bruhns (née Klamroth, 1938–2019), German journalist and author

See also
Erich Klamroth, fictional character in 1956 West German film Before Sundown